William Rand may refer to:

 William Rand (physician) (fl. 1650–1660), English medical reformer
 William Rand (athlete) (1886–1981), competed in the 1908 Summer Olympics
 William H. Rand (1828–1915), American publisher, co-founder of Rand McNally